The Norfolk Yankees were a Western League baseball team based in Norfolk, Nebraska, United States that played from 1940 to 1941. They were affiliated with the New York Yankees.

Jim Dyck, who played Major League Baseball from 1951 to 1956, is the only known major leaguer to play for the team.

References

Baseball teams established in 1940
Defunct minor league baseball teams
Defunct baseball teams in Nebraska
1940 establishments in Nebraska
1941 disestablishments in Nebraska
Baseball teams disestablished in 1941
Madison County, Nebraska
Defunct Western League teams